Harry Wilson (birth unknown – death unknown) was an English rugby union and professional rugby league footballer who played in the 1890s and 1900s. He played representative level rugby union (RU) for Yorkshire, and at club level for Methley RFC (in Methley, Leeds, club now defunct), Castleford RUFC (in Castleford, Wakefield), Rothwell RFC (in Rothwell, Leeds, club now defunct), and Morley R.F.C. (in Morley, Leeds), and representative level rugby league (RL) for Great Britain, England and Yorkshire, and at club level for Hunslet (Heritage No. 236), as a forward (prior to the specialist positions of), during the era of contested scrums.

Playing career

International honours
Harry Wilson won caps for England (RL) while at Hunslet in 1906 against Other Nationalities, in 1908 against New Zealand, and won caps for Great Britain (RL) while at Hunslet in 1908 against New Zealand (3 matches).

County honours
Harry Wilson won cap(s) for Yorkshire (RU), and he won cap(s) for Yorkshire (RL) while at Hunslet, including against New Zealand at Belle Vue, Wakefield on Wednesday 18 December 1907.

Challenge Cup Final appearances
Harry Wilson played as a forward, i.e. number 8, in Hunslet's 14-0 victory over Hull F.C. in the 1907–08 Challenge Cup Final during the 1907–08 season at Fartown Ground, Huddersfield on Saturday 25 April 1908, in front of a crowd of 18,000.

County Cup Final appearances
Harry Wilson played as a forward, i.e. number 13, in Hunslet's 13-3 victory over Halifax in the 1905 Yorkshire County Cup Final during the 1905–06 season at Park Avenue, Bradford on Saturday 2 December 1905, and played as a forward, i.e. number 9, in the 17-0 victory over Halifax in the 1907 Yorkshire County Cup Final during the 1907–08 season at Headingley Rugby Stadium, Leeds on Saturday 21 December 1907.

All Four Cups, and "The Terrible Six"
Harry Wilson was a member of Hunslet's 1907–08 season All Four Cups winning team, the Forwards were known as "The Terrible Six" they were; Tom Walsh, Harry Wilson, Jack Randall, Bill "Tubby" Brookes, Bill Jukes and John Willie Higson.

Family
Harry Wilson was the great-grandfather of the association footballer of the 1980s, 1990s and 2000s; Peter Swan.

References

External links
Search for "Wilson" at espn.co.uk (RU)
 
 
Search for "Harry Wilson" "Rugby" at britishnewspaperarchive.co.uk

Castleford R.U.F.C. players
England national rugby league team players
English rugby league players
English rugby union players
Great Britain national rugby league team players
Hunslet F.C. (1883) players
Morley R.F.C. players
Place of birth missing
Place of death missing
Rugby league forwards
Year of birth missing
Year of death missing
Yorkshire County RFU players
Yorkshire rugby league team players